The siege of Aligarh also known as the Battle of Aligarh was fought between the Maratha Confederacy and the British East India Company during the Second Anglo-Maratha War (1803–1805) at Aligarh, India.

Aligarh Fort, one of the strongest forts in India, was fortified and commanded by a French mercenary officer Pierre Perron. It was laid under siege on 1 September 1803, by the British 76th Regiment, now known as the Yorkshire Regiment, under General Lord Gerard Lake. It was captured from the Marathas and French on 4 September 1803. During the assault, fourteen ditches were lined with sword-blades and poisoned chevaux-de-frise around the fort by the French soldiers. The walls were reinforced with French artillery. Tigers and Lions of Scindia's menagerie were also used by the French. During the battle, the British lost as many as 900 soldiers. The then Duke of Wellington declared the capture as "One of the most extraordinary feats of the British conquest of Northern India".

See also
1803 Garhwal earthquake

References

External links
Decisive Battles of India from 1746 to 1849 Inclusive, By George Bruce Malleson

Conflicts in 1803
Ally Ghur 1803
Ally Ghur 1803
Ally Ghur 1803
Ally Ghur 1803
Aligarh
1803 in India
September 1803 events